Sgt. Pepper's Lonely Hearts Club Band on the Road was a 1974 off-Broadway production directed by Tom O'Horgan. It opened at the Beacon Theatre in New York on November 17, 1974 and ran for a total of 66 performances.

The plot tells of a Candide-like rock music singer, Billy Shears, who marries Strawberry Fields. Billy loses her to death, and his own integrity to Maxwell's Silver Hammermen, Jack, Sledge and Claw, dressed in chain mail and representing the Hells Angels of the commercial music business. Billy's bête noire is a temptress named Lucy.

Among the original cast were Ted Neeley as Billy Shears and Alaina Reed as Lucy. David Patrick Kelly played Sgt. Pepper.

The musical would later be loosely adapted into the Sgt. Pepper's Lonely Hearts Club Band film.

John Lennon attended several rehearsals and the Opening Night performance with May Pang. It was caught on film in the original promo video for "Whatever Gets You Through the Night".

Credits

Produced by Robert Stigwood, in association with Brian Avnet and Scarab Productions, Inc.
Executive Producer, Peter Brown
Associate Producers: Gatchell and Neufeld, Steven Singer, Steven Metz and Howard Dando

Music and Lyrics by John Lennon, Paul McCartney, George Harrison and Ringo Starr
Directed by Tom O’Horgan
Scenic Design by Robin Wagner
Lighting Design by Jules Fisher
Costume Design by Randy Barceló
Sound Design by Abe Jacob
Music Arranged and conducted by Gordon Lowry Harrell

Production Supervisor: Richard Scanga

Opening Night Cast:
Ted Neeley - Billy Shears
Allan Nicholls - Jack Hammer
Kay Cole - Strawberry fields
B.G. Gibson - Claw Hammer
William Parry - Sledge Hammer
Alaina Reed - Lucy

Hammeroids:
 Blake Anderson
 Arlana Blue
 Ron Capossoli
 Stoney Reece
 Jason Roberts

Understudies:
 Billy – David Patrick Kelley
 Strawberry & Lucy – Stoney Reece
 Sgt. Pepper, Polythene Pam – Michael Meadows

References

Off-Broadway musicals
Musicals based on songs by the Beatles
1974 musicals
Jukebox musicals